Outer Circle may refer to:

 Birmingham Outer Circle, West Midlands bus route 11, a 27-mile route around Birmingham, England
 Outer Circle (London), a railway route in London 1872–1908, and the related Super Outer Circle
 Outer Circle railway line, a steam-era suburban railway line in Melbourne, Australia
 now the Outer Circle Trail
 one of Kachru's Three Circles of English
 one of the Three circles, an exercise/diagram used by recovering addicts
 Inner–outer directions, labels that identify the direction of travel on opposing lanes of traffic

See also

Outer Ring (disambiguation)